Tobias Pilegaard Mikkelsen (born 18 September 1986) is a Danish former professional footballer who played as a winger, he last played for Helsingborgs IF in the Allsvenskan. He has eight senior caps for Denmark, as well as a total of 11 youth caps with the U20 and U21 teams.

Club career

Brøndby
After helping Lyngby BK gain promotion to the Danish Superliga, Mikkelsen switched to league rivals Brøndby IF in the summer of 2007.  On 21 July 2007, he made an impressive home debut for Brøndby in their match against FC Nordsjælland scoring a goal and also notching an assist a 2–2 draw. He was signed to fill in the right winger spot in a 4–3–3 system, but coach Tom Køhlert and later Kent Nielsen decided to use a 4–4–2 formation which resulted in sparse time on the pitch for the young winger.

Nordsjælland
On 18 August 2009, Mikkelsen signed for FC Nordsjælland. In Nordsjælland Mikkelsen won the Danish Cup twice, in 2010 and 2011. In the 2011–12 season, he won the Danish Superliga with Nordsjælland for the first time, which provided direct qualification for the Champions League.

Greuther Fürth
On 26 July 2012, Mikkelsen signed a three-year deal with German outfit SpVgg Greuther Fürth.

Rosenborg 
On 16 January 2013, Mikkelsen signed a four-year contract with Norwegian side Rosenborg BK.

On 30 July 2015, he scored a brace in a 3–2 win over Hungarian side Debreceni in the first leg of the Europa League third qualifying round.

On 25 October 2015, Mikkelsen helped Rosenborg win the 2015 Tippeligaen with two rounds left. A month later, Rosenborg secured the double, winning 2–0 in the final of the Norwegian Cup against Sarpsborg 08.

Nordsjælland
On 8 January 2016, Mikkelsen returned to his former club FC Nordsjælland signing a two-year deal.

Brisbane Roar
In May 2018 Mikkelsen was linked with a move to Australian club Brisbane Roar and subsequently signed a one-year contract in June. Mikkelsen made his Roar debut in the FFA Cup in August 2018 at home to Melbourne City

International career
Mikkelsen received his first international call up to the Danish national team in November 2011, to face Sweden and Finland, making his debut for Denmark against Finland 15 November 2011.

Mikkelsen was once again called up in December 2011, for Denmark's tour of Thailand in January.

International goals
Scores and results list Denmark's goal tally first.

Career statistics

Honours

Club
Nordsjælland
 Danish Superliga: 2011–12
 Danish Cup (2): 2009–10, 2010–11

Rosenborg
 Tippeligaen: 2015
 Norwegian Football Cup: 2015

References

External links 
 Tobias Mikkelsen at Brondby.com 
 Tobias Mikkelsen at DBU.dk 
 

Living people
1986 births
Danish men's footballers
Denmark youth international footballers
Denmark under-21 international footballers
Denmark international footballers
Lyngby Boldklub players
Brøndby IF players
FC Nordsjælland players
SpVgg Greuther Fürth players
Rosenborg BK players
Brisbane Roar FC players
Danish Superliga players
Bundesliga players
Eliteserien players
UEFA Euro 2012 players
Danish expatriate men's footballers
Expatriate footballers in Germany
Expatriate footballers in Norway
Danish expatriate sportspeople in Norway
Association football wingers
Expatriate soccer players in Australia
People from Helsingør
Sportspeople from the Capital Region of Denmark